Girolamo Pignatelli, C.R. (1566 – 22 December 1618) was a Roman Catholic prelate who served as Archbishop of Rossano (1615–1618).

Biography
Girolamo Pignatelli was born in Naples, Italy in 1566 and ordained a priest in the Congregation of Clerics Regular of the Divine Providence.
On 18 May 1615, he was appointed during the papacy of Pope Paul V as Archbishop of Rossano.
On 28 May 1615, he was consecrated bishop by Giovanni Garzia Mellini, Cardinal-Priest of Santi Quattro Coronati with Ascanio Gesualdo, Archbishop of Bari-Canosa, and Giovanni Battista del Tufo, Bishop Emeritus of Acerra, serving as co-consecrators. 
He served as Archbishop of Rossano until his death on 22 December 1618.

References

External links and additional sources
 (for Chronology of Bishops)
 (for Chronology of Bishops)

17th-century Italian Roman Catholic archbishops
Bishops appointed by Pope Paul V
1566 births
1618 deaths
Clergy from Naples
Theatine bishops